The 1939 Texas Mines Miners football team was an American football team that represented Texas School of Mines (now known as University of Texas at El Paso) as a member of the Border Conference during the 1939 college football season. In its 11th season under head coach Mack Saxon, the team compiled a 5–4 record (3–2 against Border Conference opponents), finished fourth in the conference, and outscored opponents by a total of 110 to 71.

Schedule

References

Texas Mines
UTEP Miners football seasons
Texas Mines Miners football